...In Color is the second studio EP by American rock band The Summer Set, that was released on June 24, 2008, by The Militia Group. It was completed shortly after the band decided to sign with The Militia Group record label. In July, the band went on tour with Anarbor and Eye Alaska. In October, the band supported Sherwood on their tour of the US.

Track listing 
"Cross Your Fingers"
"Seasons"
"She's Got The Rhythm"
"Close To Me"
"Lights'"

References

External links 

...In Color at YouTube (streamed copy where licensed)

2008 EPs
The Summer Set EPs
The Militia Group EPs